Sofie van Houtven (born 3 August 1987) is a Belgian footballer. She plays as a goalkeeper for Genk Ladies and the Belgium women's national football team.

International statistics
As of 13 June 2017

Honours
Standard Liège
 Belgian Women's Super League: 2008–09, 2010–11
 Belgian Women's Cup: 2005–06
 Belgian Women's Super Cup: 2008–09

References

External links
 

1987 births
Living people
Belgian women's footballers
Belgium women's international footballers
Women's association football goalkeepers
Standard Liège (women) players
Oud-Heverlee Leuven (women) players
KRC Genk Ladies players
BeNe League players
Super League Vrouwenvoetbal players
People from Bonheiden
Footballers from Antwerp Province